Kondon may refer to:
 , a villaɡe in Solnechny District, Russia
 , a village in Niégo Department, Burkina Faso

See also 
 Condon (disambiguation)
 Kondom (disambiguation)